The Lithuanian ambassador in Beijing is the official representative of the Government in Vilnius to the Government of the People's Republic of China.

List of representatives

China–Lithuania relations

References 

 
China
Lithuania